Irineu Calixto Couto (born 27 March 1983 in São Paulo), or simply Irineu, is a Brazilian footballer who plays for Betim as a centre-back.

Biography
Born in São Paulo, Irineu started his professional career at Cruzeiro. He also loaned to Ipatinga twice, from December 2004 to April 2005 (along with Diego da Silva) and in April 2006, which he played for the club at the national cup (2005 and 2006). Originally loaned to the club until the end of year, he left for Portuguese side Sporting Braga in August 2006. He also signed a new 3-year contract with Cruzeiro in July 2005. In January 2007 he returned to Brazil and loaned to Flamengo.

In August 2007 he left for Marília.

In January 2008 he was loaned to Portuguese Primeira Liga side Académica. The team avoided from relegation.

In July 2008, he signed a 3-year contract with Denizlispor after his contract with Cruzeiro expired.

In September 2009 he returned to Brazil for a third time, for Juventude. After the season, he left for Paraná. In 2011, he left for newly promoted side ABC.

Honours
National
Brazilian Cup: 2003
Brazilian League Série A: 2003
State level
Minas Gerais State League: 2003, 2004, 2006
Rio de Janeiro State League: 2007
Guanabara Cup: 2007

References

External links

 Portuguese Liga Profile (2007–08) at LPFP.pt (2006–07 season) 
 
 soccerterminal  
 Guardian Stats Centre
 
 Futpedia 
 

Brazilian footballers
Primeira Liga players
Süper Lig players
Cruzeiro Esporte Clube players
Ipatinga Futebol Clube players
S.C. Braga players
CR Flamengo footballers
Marília Atlético Clube players
Associação Académica de Coimbra – O.A.F. players
Denizlispor footballers
Esporte Clube Juventude players
Paraná Clube players
ABC Futebol Clube players
Agremiação Sportiva Arapiraquense players
Association football central defenders
Brazilian expatriate footballers
Expatriate footballers in Turkey
Expatriate footballers in Portugal
Brazilian expatriate sportspeople in Portugal
Brazilian expatriate sportspeople in Turkey
Footballers from São Paulo
1983 births
Living people
Pan American Games medalists in football
Pan American Games silver medalists for Brazil
Footballers at the 2003 Pan American Games
Medalists at the 2003 Pan American Games